A natural disaster is a sudden event that always causes widespread destruction, major collateral damage, or loss of life, brought about by forces other than the acts of human beings. A natural disaster might be caused by earthquakes, flooding, volcanic eruption, landslide, hurricanes, etc. To be classified as a disaster, it will have profound environmental effects and/or human loss and frequently causes financial loss.

Ten deadliest natural disasters by highest estimated death toll excluding epidemics and famines
This list takes into account only the highest estimated death toll for each disaster and lists them accordingly. It does not include epidemics and famines. It does not include several volcanic eruptions with uncertain death tolls resulting from collateral effects such as crop failures; see List of volcanic eruptions by death toll. The list also does not include the 1938 Yellow River flood, which was caused by the deliberate destruction of dikes.

{| class="sortable wikitable static-row-numbers" style="font-size:100%"
|-
! Death toll (Highest estimate)
! Event
! Location
! Date
|-
| <ref name="cbc.ca">The world's worst natural disasters Calamities of the 20th and 21st centuries CBC News'.' Retrieved October 29, 2010.</ref>  
| 1931 China floods
| rowspan="3" | China
| 
|-
| 
| 1887 Yellow River flood
| 
|-
| 
| 1976 Tangshan earthquake 
| 
|-
| 
| 1970 Bhola cyclone 
| East Pakistan (now Bangladesh)
| 
|-
| 
| 2010 Haiti earthquake
| Haiti
| 
|-
| +
| 526 Antioch earthquake
| Byzantine Empire (now Hatay/Turkey)
| 
|-
| 
| 1839 Coringa cyclone
| Andhra Pradesh, India
| 
|-
| 
| 1139 Ganja earthquake
|  Seljuk Empire (present-day Azerbaijan)
| 
|-
| 
| 1920 Haiyuan earthquake
|  China
| 
|-
| 
| 1138 Aleppo earthquake
|  Syria
| 
|-
|}

Deadliest natural disasters by year excluding epidemics and famines
20th century

21st century

Lists of deadliest natural disasters by cause
Avalanches/landslides

Disease outbreaks

Death counts are historical totals unless indicated otherwise.
Events in boldface are ongoing.

Earthquakes

FaminesNote: Some of these famines may have been caused or partially caused by humans.Note: This list is ranked by number of deaths. Not deaths per capita, as in the percentage of the population.FloodsNote: Some of these floods and landslides may be partially caused by humans – for example, by failure of dams, levees, seawalls or retaining walls.This list does not include the man-made 1938 Yellow River flood caused entirely by a deliberate man-made act (an act of war, destroying dikes).Heat wavesNote: Measuring the number of deaths caused by a heat wave requires complicated statistical analysis, since heat waves tend to cause large numbers of deaths among people weakened by other conditions. As a result, the number of deaths is only known with any accuracy for heat waves in the modern era in countries with developed healthcare systems.Impact eventsNote: While there is only one scientifically verified case of astronomical objects resulting in human fatalities, there have been several reported occurrences throughout human history. Consequently, the fatalities for almost all events listed are considered unofficial.Limnic eruptionsNote: Only 2 cases in recorded history.Tornadoes

Tropical cyclonesNote: Earlier versions of this list have included the so-called 'Bombay Cyclone of 1882' in tenth position, but this supposed event has been proven to be a hoax.TsunamisNote: A possible tsunami in 1782 that caused about 40,000 deaths in the Taiwan Strait area may have been of "meteorological" origin (a cyclone).Volcanic eruptions

Wildfires

Winter storms

See also

 List of countries by natural disaster risk
 List of all known deadly earthquakes since 1900
 List of disasters in Canada
 List of disasters in Indonesia
 List of disasters in the Philippines
 List of disasters in Thailand
 List of natural disasters in the British Isles
 List of natural disasters in Haiti
 List of natural disasters in New Zealand
 List of natural disasters in Pakistan
 List of natural disasters in the United States
 Natural disasters in India
 Lists of nuclear disasters and radioactive incidents
 Global catastrophic risk

Other lists organized by death toll

 List of wars and anthropogenic disasters by death toll
 List of accidents and disasters by death toll
 List of battles and other violent events by death toll
 List of disasters in Antarctica by death toll
 List of disasters in Australia by death toll
 List of disasters in Canada by death toll
 List of disasters in Croatia by death toll
 List of disasters in Great Britain and Ireland by death toll
 List of disasters in New Zealand by death toll
 List of disasters in Poland by death toll
 List of disasters in Romania by death toll
 List of disasters in the United States by death toll
 Tsunamis affecting the British Isles

Notes

References

External links
 Natural Hazards Data from NOAA National Geophysical Data Center
 "When Nature Attacks" from Newsweek''
 World's worst natural disasters since 1900
 Earthquake Hazards Program – USGS
 EM-DAT: The International Disaster Database managed by the Centre for Research on the Epidemiology of Disasters
 Disasters Database Report from Emergency Management Australia

Natural disasters by death toll
Natural disasters
Death toll
Lists of wildfires